I guappi (internationally released as Blood Brothers) is a 1974 Italian historical drama film with "poliziotteschi" and "noir" elements. This film marks the meeting between Claudia Cardinale and the director Pasquale Squitieri, who soon became her husband.

Cast
Claudia Cardinale: Lucia Esposito
Franco Nero: Nicola Bellizzi
Fabio Testi: Don Gaetano Frungillo 
Lina Polito: Nannina Scognamiglio
Raymond Pellegrin: Delegato Aiossa
Rita Forzano: Luisella
Rosalia Maggio:  Amalia Scognamiglio 
Nino Vingelli: Luigi Scarpetta
Sonia Viviani: Donna Maria

References

External links

1974 films
1970s Italian-language films
Films directed by Pasquale Squitieri
Films set in the 1890s
Poliziotteschi films
Films about the Camorra
Films with screenplays by Ugo Pirro
1970s Italian films